"Jealousy" is a song by the British singer Will Young. It was written by Will Young, Kish Mauve, and Jim Eliot for his fifth studio album Echoes (2011), while production was helmed by Richard X, with Eliot and Pete Hofmann crecited as additional producers. The song was released as the album's lead single on 19 August 2011 in the United Kingdom and received widespread acclaim from music critics, eventually winning music website Popjustice's £20 Music Prize in 2012. "Jealousy" gave Young his first UK top-five hit in five years (since "All Time Love" in 2006, which reached number three).

Reception
The Guardian described "Jealousy" as "a stately, radio-friendly slice of polite dance music with a fantastic vocal." Entertainment Focus called the track "simply stunning."

Promotion
The song received its first radio play on BBC Radio 2 on 11 July 2011.

Music video
The video for "Jealousy" was directed by Diamond Dogs and tells the story of impossible love where Young is "lusting for an otherwise engaged man." It was first released onto YouTube on 29 July 2011 featuring an album version edit of the song at a total length of three minutes and eighteen seconds.

Track listing
All tracks written by Will Young, Kish Mauve, and Jim Eliot.

Notes
 denotes additional producer
 denotes remix producer

Credits and personnel
 Jim Eliot – additional producer, writer
 Pete Hofmann – additional producer, mixing engineer
 Alex Meadows – bass
 Mima Stilwell – writer
 Tim Weller – drums
 Richard X – producer
 Will Young – vocals, writer

Charts

Weekly charts

Year-end charts

Certifications

Release history

References

2011 singles
Song recordings produced by Richard X
Songs written by Will Young
Sony Music singles
Will Young songs